Jean-Philippe Caillet (born June 24, 1977 in Boulay-Moselle) is a French footballer who currently plays for Differdange 03.

Career
He signed a contract on 26 July and in no time established a leading position in the defense of Genk. He played 26 games last season, while he was injured from January to March.

Caillet was appointed vice captain of the side in the 2006–07 season. He has recently joined Tianjin Teda for one season before being released.

In 2006 Caillet agreed in principle to represent Bulgaria, but was found ineligible by FIFA due to having made appearances for one of the French youth national sides.

References

External links
http://www.lequipe.fr/Football/FootballFicheJoueur3082.html

1977 births
Living people
People from Boulay-Moselle
French footballers
French expatriate footballers
FC Metz players
Stade Malherbe Caen players
Clermont Foot players
PFC Litex Lovech players
K.R.C. Genk players
Tianjin Jinmen Tiger F.C. players
Chinese Super League players
Ligue 1 players
Ligue 2 players
Championnat National 2 players
Belgian Pro League players
First Professional Football League (Bulgaria) players
Expatriate footballers in Bulgaria
Expatriate footballers in China
Expatriate footballers in Luxembourg
Expatriate footballers in Belgium
French expatriate sportspeople in China
Association football defenders
Sportspeople from Moselle (department)
Footballers from Grand Est
French expatriate sportspeople in Bulgaria
French expatriate sportspeople in Belgium
French expatriate sportspeople in Luxembourg